The FIL World Luge Championships 1973 took place in Oberhof, East Germany.

Men's singles

Women's singles

Men's doubles

Medal table

References
Men's doubles World Champions
Men's singles World Champions
Women's singles World Champions

FIL World Luge Championships
Sport in Oberhof, Germany
1973 in luge
1973 in German sport
Luge in Germany